Rufus T. Bess, Jr. (born September 13, 1956 in Hartsville, South Carolina) is a former professional American football cornerback in the NFL for the Oakland Raiders, Buffalo Bills, and the Minnesota Vikings.  He played college football at South Carolina State University.

He worked at North Community High School in Minneapolis, Minnesota as a football coach, staff member and teacher.

He now works at Robbinsdale Armstrong High School in Plymouth, Minnesota.

External links
Profile at nfl.com
Profile at pro-football-reference.com

1956 births
Living people
People from Hartsville, South Carolina
American football cornerbacks
South Carolina State Bulldogs football players
Buffalo Bills players
Minnesota Vikings players
Chicago Bruisers players
National Football League replacement players